Jaban may refer to:

Peter John Jaban, Malaysian DJ
Jaban, Dodangeh, a village in East Azerbaijan Province, Iran
Jaban, Tehran, a village in Iran
 Jaban (film)